Constant Omari Selemani  (born 14 January 1958), is a Congolese football administrator and a member of the FIFA Council.

Career 
In September 2015, Omari was appointed as the chairman of FIFA's Task Force Against Racism and Discrimination.

On 19 July 2019, Omari was nominated to be the first vice president of Confederation of African Football, taking over the portfolio from Amaju Pinnick.

FIFA announced on 27 January 2021 that Omari had failed an integrity and eligibility check and was barred from seeking reelection.

Corruption allegations 
On 24 June 2021, the FIFA Ethics Committee banned Omari for one year from any football-related activities for accepting bribes from Lagardère Live Entertainment in 2016.

References

External links 
 OMARI Constant profile on FIFA

1958 births
Living people
Place of birth missing (living people)
Football people in the Democratic Republic of the Congo
FIFA officials
Members of the CAF Executive Committee
21st-century Democratic Republic of the Congo people
Association football executives
Presidents of the Confederation of African Football